Panokseon ("board roofed" ship) was an oar and sail propelled ship that was the main class of warship used by Joseon during the late 16th century.  The first ship of this class was constructed in 1555.  It was a ship made of sturdy pine wood, and was instrumental in the victories over the numerically superior Japanese Navy during the Japanese invasions of Korea (1592–98). Admiral Yi Sun-sin (1545–1598) of the Joseon navy employed them alongside turtle ships during the war with great success.

A key feature of a panokseon was its multiple decks. The first deck had non-combatant personnel, such as the rowers, who were positioned between the lower deck and the upper deck, away from enemy fire. The combatant personnel were stationed on the upper deck, which allowed them to attack the enemy from a higher vantage point. The panokseon also had a raised roofed observation platform where the commander stood.

Characteristics
In line with the traditional structure of Korean ships, the panokseon had a U-shaped hull and a flat keel. This feature was due to the nature of the Korean coastal waters, which have a large tidal range and flat, expansive tidal plains. A flat keel enables a ship to sit comfortably on the tideland when the tide is out, after coming ashore or inside a wharf at high water. It also ensured greater mobility and a shallow draft and in particular allowed a ship to make sharp changes of direction at short notice. This panokseon was one of the main reasons why Admiral Yi was able to employ the Crane Wing formation at the Battle of Hansan Island with great success.

Panokseons were propelled by both sails and oars.  Of the two basic types of sail, square and lateen, the square gives a strong performance downwind but struggles windward, whereas the fore-and-aft lateen excels against the wind, though requiring a large crew to handle it. In the West, square sails were used in the galleys of Ancient Greece and the Viking longships, and the fore-and-aft variety as early as the Mediterranean dromons of the Middle Ages. When the Age of Discovery began in the fifteenth century, multiple-masted ships equipped with both types of sails eventually appeared. In Korea fore-and-aft sail equipped ships had been in use since the eighth century. The panokseon and turtle ship therefore had two masts by default, and their position and angle could easily be managed so that the sails could be used in all winds, whether adverse or favorable.

The ships had two to three levels stacked up on top of each other. By having multiple levels the rowers at the bottom were relatively safe, and marines at the top would have a height advantage over the enemy, firing down upon them and avoiding boarding of the ship. The upper deck had a tower in the middle of the ship that would be used for command and observation.  The deck of the panokseon was broad and flat, making it ideal for the installation of cannons.

The ship usually had 8 to 10 oars on each side, 50 to 60 oarsmen and sailors and another 125 marines (i.e. fighting men).

Construction
Because of the rough waters around Korea's coast, as well as the sudden changes in tides and currents, Korean boats throughout history had to be strong. Korean ship building tradition created simple, but very structurally sound vessels. Throughout Korea's naval history, strength and power was emphasized rather than speed.

Two types of woods were used to construct panokseon: pine for the hull and oak for the pegs and masts. Oak is a strong but heavy wood, so its use on ships was limited to the frame. Pine was also strong, but much lighter. Pine was usually allowed to season incompletely so that it would bend flexibly and not become too stiff. Despite its advantages pine had many knots and had to be cut thickly, thus the panokseon were built using thicker timbers. Instead of iron nails panokseons were held together by means of oak pegs, matching indentations, and interlocking teeth. This meant that as its boards absorbed water and expanded the fasteners did not rust, thus accounting for greater integrity of the hull.

Weapons

Panokseons had on board several varieties of cannon, such as those named Heaven, Earth, Black and Yellow. Heaven was the largest cannon with the greatest range and the most common cannon on the ships. Earth was a smaller cannon and Black and Yellow were smaller still. Hwachas were also used on panokseons.

Another noteworthy aspect of Korea’s heavy fire-arms is that they were not all invented to meet the sudden emergency of war. These weapons in fact made their appearance some 200 years prior to Japanese invasions of Korea (1592–98). Thanks to the efforts of Choe Museon, a general and a chemist, Korea began manufacturing and developing gunpowder and powder-based weapons. Korean cannons first saw action in 1380 against a large fleet of Japanese pirate ships, and were found to be a great success.

In the 15th century, under the lead of Sejong the Great, who was himself a pioneer of scientific research, the performance of these heavy artillery improved dramatically. Naval cannons were also developed at this time and among them, Heaven, Earth, Black and Yellow cannon were later employed by Yi Sun-sin. The development of artillery steadily continued after King Sejong, and saw the invention of the bigyeokjincholloe, a timed grenade that flung out hundreds of metal shards upon explosion, and the dapoki, a machine capable of firing many arrows at once. One of the types of cannons were arrows with a pipe filled with gunpowder.

Comparison to Japanese warships
The differences between the Panokseon and Japanese ships were significant. Japanese equivalents were the large Atakebune class and the medium Sekibune-class ships. In contrast to the Panokseon, the hulls of the Japanese vessels had sharp, V-shaped bows. A sharp underside was favorable for swift or long-distance travel in the open seas because of lower water resistance (thus these ships had faster cruising speeds). Since this variety of hull had a deep draft (penetrates deeper into the water), however, the ship’s turning radius was considerably large and changing direction was therefore a lengthy process. In addition, ships with larger drafts have a more difficult time of navigating narrow and shallower waters. Japanese ships were thus vastly less maneuverable than the panokseon in Korea's narrow channel waters.

The medium-sized Sekibune ships, smaller craft and most Japanese transport ships had a single mast and could only sail in favorable winds.  The Atakebune was an exception in that it had two masts, but the main parts of its vessels were square-rigged and their sails were again limited to use in favorable winds.

It is worthwhile also to compare the hulls of the two nations’ respective warships, and their relative strength. The panokseon used thick, high density boards, giving an overall sturdiness to the ship’s structure. Japanese warships were structurally weaker, due to the thin, lower density timber used to build them, particularly cedar and fir.  These were light weight woods and because they didn't have as many knots as pine, could be cut thinner. The Sekibune in particular, being the standard warship of the Japanese fleet, was built to be as light as possible, increasing its speed at the expense of structural integrity. This is consistent with traditional Japanese naval tactics of the time, which emphasized boarding enemy ships and engaging their crews in hand-to-hand combat.

Another major difference was the use of iron nails versus the use of wood pegs to hold the ship together. Korean ships were held together by interlocking teeth in the wood and wood pegs.  The Japanese warships, on the other hand, relied on iron nails which, as time passed and corrosion and rust set in, eventually weakened the hull.

This difference in structural integrity also determined the number of cannons that could be carried on board.  Because the Japanese ships lacked the strength to withstand the recoil of cannon, even the largest ship class, Atakebune, could carry only four at most (six if there were two smaller breech loading swivel guns). A Sekibune could only carry two. A panokseon could carry at least 20 cannons, but usually carried more (maybe up to 50). Since the hulls of Korean warships were strong enough, moreover, they were able to carry a large number of long-range cannons. These could be installed with ease on the large upper-deck of panokseon ships, and their angle configured at will to increase the range.  Since the Japanese warships only allowed for a very limited number of cannons, their sailors mainly used muskets, which had a range of 100–200 m (330–660 ft) and Japanese naval commanders were sure that a volley of musket bullets would clear the enemy ships and allow for the grapple and board method.

The traditional and main naval strategy employed by the Japanese was that of "grapple-and-board", whereby sailors would attempt to board an enemy ship and fall to sword fighting on the decks. This method was mainly used because Japanese soldiers excelled at melee combat and because their ships were very fast. The Japanese Navy's concept of sea battle was therefore one of a fight between crews rather than the vessels themselves. This was the most common naval strategy in the world during this time, and was also used by the Spanish and the home fleets of the Mediterranean and Indian Ocean of the day. The Korean Navy, however, utilizing superior warships and firepower, engaged in a more modern, distanced kind of naval warfare. During Hideyoshi's invasions of Korea, a vast number of Japan's transports and warships were destroyed by Admiral Yi Sun-shin's leadership and strategies, superior firepower, and knowledge of strategic points on what amounts to a home field advantage.

See also
Military history of Korea
History of Korea
Joseon Navy

Notes

Naval ships of Korea
Joseon dynasty
Ship types
Naval sailing ship types
16th-century ships